Cliff Davies may refer to:

 Cliff Davies (musician) (1948–2008), British drummer known for his work with If and Ted Nugent
 Cliff Davies (rugby union) (1919–1967), Welsh international rugby player
 Clifford Davis (music manager) British musician and music manager, one-time manager of Fleetwood Mac